Annapolis is a 1928 silent film drama directed by Christy Cabanne. It was released with Photophone sound and effects. It stars Johnny Mack Brown, Jeanette Loff and Hugh Allan.

Prints and incomplete prints exist.

Cast
Johnny Mack Brown as Bill
Hugh Allan as Herbert
Jeanette Loff as Betty
Maurice Ryan as Fat
William Bakewell as Skippy
Byron Munson as First Classman
Charlotte Walker as Aunt
Hobart Bosworth as Father

References

External links

1928 films
American silent feature films
Pathé Exchange films
Films directed by Christy Cabanne
1928 drama films
American black-and-white films
Silent American drama films
1920s American films